The  are the last thirteen imperial anthologies of Japanese waka poetry. They are:
 Shinchokusen Wakashū
 Shokugosen Wakashū 
 Shokukokin Wakashū
 Shokushūi Wakashū
 Shingosen Wakashū 
 Gyokuyō Wakashū
 Shokusenzai Wakashū
 Shokugoshūi Wakashū
 Fūga Wakashū
 Shinsenzai Wakashū
 Shinshūi Wakashū
 Shingoshūi Wakashū
 Shinshokukokin Wakashū

Also See
 List of Japanese poetry anthologies

Japanese poetry anthologies